Lords of Appeal, informally called Law Lords, were members of the Appellate Committee of the House of Lords. The Appellate Jurisdiction Act 1876 allowed life peers to be appointed to the upper house for the specific purpose of serving on the committee, and they were called Lords of Appeal in Ordinary. The committee was reconstituted as the Supreme Court of the United Kingdom and many incumbent law lords were co-opted. Later-appointed justices have Lord or Lady as a courtesy title.

The coats of arms of many law lords, along with those of other senior judicial officeholders, are displayed on the walls and windows of Lincoln's Inn. They are also recorded in various editions of Debrett's House of Commons and the Judicial Bench.

Law Lords appointed by Queen Victoria (1876-1900)

Law Lords appointed by King Edward VII (1905-1909)

Law Lords appointed by King George V (1910-1935) 

No Lords of Appeal were appointed during Edward VIII's short reign.

Law Lords appointed by King George VI (1938-1951)

Law Lords appointed by Queen Elizabeth II (1953-2009)

Supreme Court Justices appointed by Queen Elizabeth II (2009-2022)

Supreme Court Justices appointed by King Charles III (2022-present) 
None yet appointed.

Notes
†Ennobled in pursuance of the Life Peerages Act 1958.

References

Armorials of the United Kingdom
Committees of the House of Lords
Heraldry and law
Personal armorials